Elasmopus arafura is a marine species of amphipod in the family, Maeridae, and was first described in 2011 by Lauren E. Hughes and James K. Lowry.

It is found on reefs off the Northern Territory and Western Australia.

References

External links
Elasmopus arafura occurrence data from GBIF

Crustaceans described in 2011
Taxa named by James K. Lowry
Taxa named by Lauren E. Hughes
Amphipoda